John Gobin may refer to:

 John P. S. Gobin, Union Army officer and Lieutenant Governor of Pennsylvania
 John Gobin (polo), American polo player